Khoái Châu is a rural district of Hưng Yên province in the Red River Delta region of Vietnam. In Sino-Vietnamese script, used until 1919, the name is given as 快州.

History

Feudal time
During the Hùng kings period, Khoái Châu belonged to Giao Chỉ borough.
During the Ngô dynasty, Khoái Châu was renamed Đằng Châu.
During the Đinh dynasty, Khoái Châu belonged to Đằng Đạo.
During the Lý and Trần dynasties, Khoái Châu was renamed Khoái Lộ.

Geography
 Khoái Châu district is on the left bank of the Red River. It borders Văn Giang and Yên Mỹ districts to the north, Ân Thi district to the east, Kim Động district to the south, Hanoi's Thường Tín and Phú Xuyên districts to the west.

Demography

Administration
Khoái Châu district is divided into 26 xã (communes). The capital is Khoái Châu.

As of 2003 the district had a population of 187,420. The district covers an area of 131 km². The district capital lies at Khoái Châu.

References

Districts of Hưng Yên province